Kesselgarden or  refers to the way "Castle Garden" was pronounced by Yiddish-speaking Eastern European Jews who settled in the United States in the late 19th and early 20th centuries. Castle Garden was a facility on the southern tip of Manhattan that received immigrants from 1855 through 1890. Thousands of Jews entered the U.S. through Castle Garden prior to the opening of Ellis Island in 1892. "Kesselgarden" later became generalized to mean any situation that was noisy, confusing and chaotic.

The Klezmer duo Kesselgarden (Carl Shutoff, clarinet, Laurie Andres, accordion) in Seattle, Washington, take their name from this usage.

References

German words and phrases
Yiddish words and phrases
History of immigration to the United States